Aleshkovsky (masculine) or Aleshkovskaya (feminine) is a Russian surname. Notable people with the surname include:

Peter Aleshkovsky (born 1957), Russian writer, historian, broadcaster, television presenter, journalist and archaeologist
Yuz Aleshkovsky (born 1929), Russian writer, poet, playwright and singer

Russian-language surnames